Amphibolips gainesi is a species of gall wasp in the family Cynipidae.

References

Further reading

 
 
 
 
 
 

Cynipidae
Insects described in 1900
Taxa named by Homer Franklin Bassett